Arjun, also known as Har Yug Mein Aayega Ek - Arjun, is an Indian Hindi-language action crime TV series which aired on Star Plus from 11 August 2012 through 23 February 2014 on Saturday and Sunday evenings. It is the fifth television series of 4 Lions Films.

Overview

Season 1

This series is about a rebellious cop, Arjun Rawte. He is transferred to the Emergency Task Force (ETF), which solves cases linked to high-profile individuals. Team ETF contains Sameer Rathore (chief), Arjun Suryakant Rawte (2nd in command), Riya Mukharjee (dies in line of duty Episode 21), Shreekant Sen (Shree) and Chandrakant Patil (Chotu).The show deals with crimes such as human trafficking, organ trade, kidnapping murder, and honor killing. ACP Arjun Suryakant Rawte rises from being 2nd in Command to lead ETF. 

Season 2
Karan (Rohit Purohit) is an ally of Arjun. A techno savvy Anjali (Shruti Bisht) and a stage artist Simran (Sheena Bajaj) join the cast. Episode 145 marks the return of ACP Sameer Rathod with the information on Sikandar. The last scene shows Arjun packing his stuff and leaving in a taxi.

Cast
Season 1

 Shaleen Malhotra as A.C.P. Arjun Sooryakant Rawte:
 Behzaad Khan as A.C.P. Sameer Dhamsingh Rathore (ETF Chief)
 Sana Makbul as Riya Mukherjee (Statistical Analyst) (Dead) 
 Siddharth Sen as Inspector Shreekant "Shree" Sen (Tech Expert)
 Ketan Karande as Inspector Chandrakant "Chhotu" Patil (Commando) 
 Shital Shah as Inspector Ayesha Kapoor / Drug Peddler Nadia (undercover) 
 Ritu Chauhan as Dr.Lisa D'Cruz (Forensic Expert)
 Mrunal Thakur as Sakshi Anand (Crime Journalist)
 Sameksha as Roshni Arjun Rawte (Arjun's wife; deceased])
 Bikramjeet Kanwarpal as D.I.G Dustin Coelho
 Rajesh Kumar as Pathan Lala (Episode 1 & Episode 12)
 Mansi Srivastava as Payal Verma (Episode 5)
 Basant Bhatt as Varun (Episode 6)
 Harsh Khurana as Antiques Collector (Episode 13/14)
 Aashish Kaul as Home Minister Mangesh Joshi (Episode 16) / Dr. Hariharan (Episode 119)
 Priya Ahuja Rajda as Journalist (Episode 16)
 Karuna Verma as Dr. Kamala (Episode 18)
 Loveleen Kaur Sasan as Shweta (Episode 19)
 Mita Vashisht as Sharda Devi (Episode 24)
 Ankur Nayyar as Chess Grandmaster Hiten Saxena (Episode 25)
 Sunayana Fozdar as Sandhya Hiten Saxena (Episode 25)
 Saanvi Talwar as Neha Joseph (Episode 34)
 Vinita Mahesh as Anjali Yadav (Episode 34)
 Ojaswi Aroraa as Meera ( Episode 42)
 Mansi Sharma as Shilpa Singh (Episode 49)
 Bipasha Basu as Maya (Episode 61)
 Gungun Uprari as Sakshi Gupta (Episode 61)
 Neetha Shetty as Latika Rai (Episode 63) / Mahi (Episode 121)
 Amrapali Dubey as Urmilla Satija (Episode 70)
 Harshad Arora as Aniket (Episode 83) 
 Neena Cheema as Kalyani Pratap Singh (Episode 83)
 Anushka Singh as Pushpa Chabria (Episode 85)
 Raman Khatri as Dinesh Chopra (Episode 85)
 Nisha Nagpal as Anjali Chabria (Episode 5)/ Kiran Joshi ( Episode 90)
 Ekta Tiwari as Sheela Taware (Episode 87)
 Shehzad Shaikh as Viren Sharma (Episode 98)
 Kishwer Merchant as Dr.Chhaya Sinha (Episode 99)
 Vinti Idnani as Dolly Chopra (Episode 103)
 Sudesh Berry as Auto-Driver S. Yadav (Episode 104)
 Narayani Shastri as Senior Inspector Lata Mane (Episode 106)
 Ali Hassan as Raghu (Episode 108)
 Vikas Bhalla as Neeraj (Episode 109)
 Sumit Kaul as Criminal Antagonist (Episode 111)
 Tanvi Thakkar as Smita Shastri (Episode 114)
 Navin Prabhakar as a Psychopath (Episode 115)
 Sanjay Swaraj as Mr. Patel (Episode 118)
 Vinod Kapoor as Dr. Abhijeet Ghosh (Episode 120)
 Samiksha Bhatnagar as ACP Preeti (Pune Police Special Branch) (Episode 122)
 Daya Shankar Pandey as Taxi Driver Aslam Khan (Episode 122)
 Gurdeep Kohli as Senior Inspector Meenakshi Dixit (Episode 124)
 Arjun Punj as Inspector Raghu Rajput (Episode 124)
 Rishika Mihani as Psychiatrist Chitra (Episode 125)

Recurring Cast [From episode 129]

 Shaleen Malhotra as ACP Arjun Suryakant Rawte
 Behzaad Khan as ACP Sameer Dhamsingh Rathore
 Rohit Purohit as Karan  
 Sheena Bajaj as Simran
 Shruti Bisht as Anjali (Techie)

Cameos

 Saanvi Talwar as Priyanka Barar (Episode 130)
 Aditi Gowitrikar as Mohini (Episode 134)
 Ashwin Kaushal as Karsan Bhai Patel / Mr. Mehta (Episode 136)
 Puneet Tejwani as Makrand (Episode 136)
 Nandini Singh as Priyal (Episode 142)

List of episodes

Critical reception
DNA India said that it has good action scenes, but Malhotra was "a little stiff".

References

External links
 Official website on hotstar   
 

Indian action television series
Indian thriller television series
StarPlus original programming
2012 Indian television series debuts
Television series by 4 Lions Films
2014 Indian television series endings